Toensbergia is a genus of lichen-forming fungi in the family Sporastatiaceae. The genus was circumscribed by Mika Bendiksby and Einar Timdal in 2013. The genus name honours Norwegian lichenologist Tor Tønsberg, "in appreciation of his important work on sorediate, corticolous lichens". The type species is Toensbergia leucococca, which was formerly classified in genus Hypocenomyce, presumably due to its resemblance (morphological, chemical, and ecological) to Hypocenomyce xanthococca.

Description
Toensbergia species are characterised by having a thallus comprising tiny, adnate, crenulate (with a finely scalloped edge), grayish-white areolae. The lichens lack a hypothallus (a growth of undifferentiated fungal mycelium below the thallus), and contain the secondary chemical alectorialic acid.

Species
Toensbergia blastidiata  – Alaska
Toensbergia geminipara 
Toensbergia leucococca

References

Ostropales
Lecanoromycetes genera
Lichen genera
Taxa described in 2013
Taxa named by Einar Timdal